Harijaona Lovanantenaina Rakotonirina (born January 25, 1969 in Antananarivo) is a Malagasy politician. A member of the National Assembly of Madagascar, he was elected as a member of the Tiako I Madagasikara party; he represents the constituency of Ambositra.

References
Profile on National Assembly site

1969 births
Living people
Members of the National Assembly (Madagascar)
Tiako I Madagasikara politicians
People from Antananarivo